Alexandre Cardoso Garcia (born 30 April 1992) is a Brazilian football player who plays for Cambodian Premier League club Boeung Ket.

Club career
He made his professional debut in the Campeonato Mineiro for Nacional on 22 February 2014 in a game against Tupi. In January 2015 he signed the contract with Sport Clube Beira-Mar (Portugal Second division). In summer 2015 Alexandre signed a two years contract with Vitoria de Setubal FC (Portugal Premier League). After that he played two seasons in C.D.Trofense (Campeonato de Portugal). On 25 July 2018 Alexandre joined Al-Nahda Club from Oman Professional Football League where he will work with his former coach in Portugal Mr. Bruno Pereira.

References

External links

Alexandre Garcia at ZeroZero

1992 births
Living people
Brazilian footballers
Brazilian expatriate footballers
Nacional Esporte Clube (MG) players
S.C. Beira-Mar players
Vitória F.C. players
C.D. Trofense players
Al-Nahda Club (Oman) players
Liga Portugal 2 players
Campeonato de Portugal (league) players
Association football midfielders
Expatriate footballers in Portugal
Expatriate footballers in Oman
Brazilian expatriate sportspeople in Portugal
Brazilian expatriate sportspeople in Oman
Damac
Expatriate footballers in Cambodia
Brazilian expatriate sportspeople in Cambodia